BC Dinamo Tbilisi is a professional basketball club that is based in Tbilisi, that plays in the Georgian Superliga. It is one of the oldest and most successful basketball clubs of Georgia and the former USSR, having won numerous national titles and the 1962 FIBA European Champions Cup (EuroLeague). The club's traditional colors are blue and white.

History
BC Dinamo was established in 1934 as the basketball division of the Dynamo Sports Society. During the 1950s and the 1960s, it was one of the leading teams of the USSR. During this period, the club won the Soviet League championships 4 times, the Soviet Cup 3 times, and finished in medal positions (top 3) of the league championship a further 8 times.

In 1960, Dinamo reached the final of the FIBA European Champions Cup (the predecessor of the current EuroLeague), where they were defeated by Rīgas ASK in 2 games. Two years later, they once again reached the final of this competition, and on that occasion, they were crowned as Europe's best team by defeating Real Madrid in a one-off game in Geneva. The club's coach at that time was the legendary Otar Korkia, who had earlier starred for the club as a player, and was voted as one of FIBA's 50 Greatest Players in 1991. Dinamo also reached the final of the FIBA Saporta Cup (FIBA's second-tier level competition) in 1969, where they were defeated by Slavia VŠ Praha.

Dinamo became the very first winners of the independent Georgian championships in 1991. In total, they have won 4 Superliga titles and one Georgian cup. Failure to attract major sponsorship saw the club struggle for a long spell in the 2000s. However, Bank of Georgia became the club patrons in 2011, President of the club was former National team captain Vakhtang Natsvlishvili which allowed the squad to be strengthened with foreign imports, and more ambitious targets to be established for the future. The success finally materialized in the 2013–14 season, with Dinamo making their first appearance in the play-off finals for over a decade, and winning the title in a convincing manner.

In October 2018, two-time NBA champion Zaza Pachulia and former basketball player Shio Khetsuriani purchased the team.

BC Dinamo Tbilisi in international competitions

Honours

Domestic competitions
 USSR Premier League
 Winners (4): 1949–50, 1952–53, 1953–54, 1967–68
 Runners-up (4): 1947, 1960, 1961, 1969
 USSR Cup
 Winners (3): 1949, 1950, 1969
 Runners-up (2): 1953, 1973
 Georgian Superliga
 Winners (6): 1990–91, 1991–92, 2002–03, 2013–14, 2016–17, 2017–18
 Runners-up (6): 1995–96, 1996–97, 2001–02, 2003–04, 2014–15, 2015–16
 Georgian Cup
 Winners (3): 2004, 2015, 2016

European competitions
 EuroLeague
 Winners (1): 1961–1962
 Runners-up (1): 1959–1960
 Semi-finalists (1): 1962–1963
 FIBA Saporta Cup
 Runners-up (1): 1968–69
 Semi-finalists (1): 1969–70

Players

Current roster

Head coaches
/ Otar Korkia
 Muhhamed Tachi

References

External links
 bcdinamotbilisi.ge სკ დინამო თბილისი, 1934 
 Eurobasket.com Team Profile 
 Superleague.ge Team Profile 

 
Dinamo Tbilisi
Basketball teams established in 1934
Basketball teams in Georgia (country)
Basketball teams in the Soviet Union
EuroLeague-winning clubs